Anders Nilsson is a Swedish songwriter, record producer, singer and film critic. He had his first official release in 2004, with a song written for the Taiwanese boyband 5566. Boyfriend was the title track of the band's second album, earning double Platinum in Taiwan, three times Platinum in Singapore and Gold in Malaysia.

Anders is a former member of the Swedish R'n'B trio LDOD and current member of the RnB duo Småstaden. He has written songs for artists like Blänk, Sem Thomasson, Yves V, Jelle Van Dael, Sofi Bonde and Robin Bengtsson, as well as music for film and TV such as the Netflix series Greenhouse Academy.

In 2008, Anders participated in the talent show Hitmakers on Swedish Kanal 5, where he performed the song Hold On.

Anders is co-author of the coffee table book USA på 30 dagar.

Discography

References

Swedish songwriters
Swedish record producers
Living people
1980 births